Otto Lerche (September 16, 1861 – March 22, 1930) was a farmer and cement contractor from Potter, Wisconsin. He was elected in 1918 as a Socialist state representative, the first Socialist ever elected to the Wisconsin State Assembly from Calumet County (although in the same election Lerche's neighbor Henry Kleist was elected to the Wisconsin State Senate from the district). He served one term.

Early years 
Lerche was born in the Town of Rantoul in Calumet County and was educated in the district schools.

Career before politics 
Prior to his election to the Assembly, he had been director of a mutual fire insurance company since 1886; school clerk since 1887, supervisor from 1893 to 1902, town clerk from 1902 to 1914; and had served as a justice of the peace.

Political career 
He was elected to the assembly in 1918, receiving 1,265 votes to 831 for James L. Cooneh, a Democrat.

Death 
He died of a stroke on March 22, 1930.

References

External links

1860 births
Farmers from Wisconsin
People from Calumet County, Wisconsin
Wisconsin state court judges
Members of the Wisconsin State Assembly
1930 deaths
Socialist Party of America politicians from Wisconsin
People from Rantoul, Wisconsin